The AIMS Games (Association of Intermediate and Middle Schools) is an annual sporting event held in Tauranga, New Zealand. The tournament attracted 166 schools in 2012, making it the biggest sporting event for 11 to 13 years old in New Zealand.

In 2016 the event generated $3 million for the local economy.   In 2019, the event returned $6.5m.

History

The event began in 2004. The first game included 14 sports and 17 schools. Since then indoor bowls were added in 2011 followed by Rugby league in 2012.

Sports

The event includes:
Badminton
Basketball
BMX
Canoe slalom
Cross country
Football
Futsal
Golf
Gymnastics
Hockey
Indoor bowls
Netball
Rock climbing
Rugby league
Rugby sevens
Squash
Swimming
Table tennis
Tennis
Water polo
Sailing
Gym sport
 Hip hop

References

External links
NZCT Aims Games

Sports competitions in New Zealand
Sport in Tauranga